General Sir Robert Brownrigg, 1st Baronet, GCB (8 February 1758 – 27 April 1833) was an Irish-born British statesman and soldier. He brought the last part of Sri Lanka under British rule.

Early career
Brownrigg was commissioned as an ensign in 1775. After service with the 9th (East Norfolk) Regiment of Foot, he was appointed Military Secretary to the Duke of York in 1795, and accompanied him to The Helder in Holland in 1799. In 1803 he was appointed Quartermaster-General to the Forces. In 1805 he was made Colonel of the 9th (East Norfolk) Regiment.

Walcheren campaign
July 1809, he joined the expedition to the Schelt. Brownrigg served as chief-of-staff to the commander Lord Chatham during the aborted operation to seize Antwerp that stalled on Walcheren island. On Chatham's instructions he drew up a memorandum assessing the situation for a council of war at which it was decided to abandon the attempt against Antwerp.

Governor of Ceylon
He left his post as Quartermaster-General to the Forces in 1811, and then, in 1813, he was appointed Governor of Ceylon. In 1815, he acquired the Kingdom of Kandy through an agreement with the help of defecting ministers of the Kandyan King, in the central region of the island, and annexed it to the British crown. The treaty was historically known as "Kandyan Convention". In recognition of his achievement, Brownrigg was created a baronet in 1816.

Brownrigg fought the Great Rebellion of 1817–18 and managed to defeat that, aided by reinforcements from India, by enacting martial law. He strengthened his power in the Kandyan Kingdom by issuing a special announcement on 21st November, 1818, which contains 56 statements, curtailing the power of aristocrats.

He attained the rank of full General in 1819 and left Ceylon the following year.

The gilded bronze ancient Statue of Tara was reputedly found on the eastern coast of Sri Lanka. It was acquired by Brownrigg, who later donated it to the British Museum when he was living near Monmouth in 1830. This account however is rejected by the authorities in Sri Lanka who believe that Brownrigg took the statue from the last King of Kandy when the British annexed Kandy.

Brownrigg died near Monmouth in 1833.

Family
In 1789, Brownrigg married Elizabeth Catharine Lewis and together they went on to have six sons and a daughter. Then in 1810 he married Sophia Bissett.

Legacy

In 2011, President Mahinda Rajapaksa of Sri Lanka initiated, at the country's Parliament, a formal revocation of Robert Brownrigg's Gazette Notification - under which participants of the Great Rebellion of 1817–18 had been condemned as "traitors" and their properties confiscated. 
Brownrigg's Gazette Notification was declared null and void, and all those he branded as "traitors" were declared to be National Heroes of Sri Lanka. A National Declaration was awarded on their behalf to their descendants on Republic Day of Sri Lanka, 22 May.

References

Sources
 Reiter, Jacqueline. The Late Lord: The Life of John Pitt–2nd Earl of Chatham. Casemate Publishers, 2017.
 

 

|-
 

|-

|-

1758 births
1833 deaths
Royal Norfolk Regiment officers
British Army generals
British Army commanders of the Napoleonic Wars
Baronets in the Baronetage of the United Kingdom
Knights Grand Cross of the Order of the Bath
Governors of British Ceylon
People of the Kingdom of Kandy
General Officers Commanding, Ceylon
19th-century British military personnel
Irish soldiers in the British Army
People from County Wicklow